André Gustave Anguilé (3 March 1920 in Libreville – 23 May 1999 in Paris) was a former Gabonese politician and diplomat. He was the foreign minister of his country from 1960–1961. He was born in Libreville, Gabon. He was the minister of public finance from 1960 to 1965.

References

References

1920 births
1999 deaths
Finance ministers of Gabon
Foreign ministers of Gabon
People from Libreville
Gabonese expatriates in France